The 2008 FAI Cup Final was a football match held at the RDS, Dublin on 23 November 2008 and was the final match of the 2008 FAI Cup competition. The match was the 85th FAI Cup Final, and the second to be held at the RDS since Lansdowne Road shut for redevelopment. The final was contested by Bohemians and Derry City, with Bohemians winning 4–3 on penalties after extra time had finished 2–2. It was the first ever FAI Cup Final to be decided by a penalty shoot-out and it was the seventh time Bohemians had won the trophy, the victory granting them a league and cup double for the season. It was the second league and cup double won by Bohemians in the 2000s. Anthony Buttimer was the referee for the match.

The winning team qualified for the 2009–10 UEFA Europa League, the first time this competition will run. The match was broadcast live on RTÉ Two.

Team news 
As was the case for much of the season, Bohemians' manager Pat Fenlon had to adjust his defence as Jason McGuinness missed the match through suspension. In McGuinness's absence, Ken Oman partnered Liam Burns in the middle of the defence. Anto Murphy left Fenlon having to choose Jason Byrne, Mindaugas Kalonas or John Paul Kelly as his replacement. Derry City had no injury or suspension concerns in the build-up to the final.

Match details

See also 
FAI Cup 2008

References

External links 
 RTÉ image gallery
 Player and referee ratings

Final
FAI Cup finals
Fai Cup Final 2008
Fai Cup Final 2008
Fai Cup Final 2008
FAI Cup Final, 2008
FAI Cup Final